Lizinovka is a rural locality (a selo) and the administrative center of Lizinovskoye Rural Settlement, Rossoshansky District, Voronezh Oblast, Russia. The population was 1,239 as of 2010. There are 7 streets.

Geography 
Lizinovka is located 15 km southwest of Rossosh (the district's administrative centre) by road. Yekaterinovka is the nearest rural locality.

References 

Rural localities in Rossoshansky District